USA-177, also known as GPS IIR-11 and GPS SVN-59, is an American navigation satellite which forms part of the Global Positioning System. It was the eleventh Block IIR GPS satellite to be launched, out of thirteen in the original configuration, and twenty one overall. It was built by Lockheed Martin, using the AS-4000 satellite bus.

USA-177 was launched at 17:53:00 UTC on 20 March 2004, atop a Delta II carrier rocket, flight number D303, flying in the 7925-9.5 configuration. The launch took place from Space Launch Complex 17B at the Cape Canaveral Air Force Station, and placed USA-177 into a transfer orbit. The satellite raised itself into medium Earth orbit using a Star-37FM apogee motor.

It is used to broadcast the PRN 19 signal, and operates in slot 3 of plane C of the GPS constellation. As of 2012 it remains in service.

References

Spacecraft launched in 2004
GPS satellites
USA satellites